British Columbia Highway 395 is a short provincial highway in the Regional District of Kootenay Boundary of British Columbia. It is a cross-border spur that connects with U.S. Route 395 (from which it derives its number) at the Canada–U.S. border crossing near Laurier, Washington. Its northern terminus is at the Crowsnest Highway (Highway 3) near Cascade, about 20 km (12 mi) east of Grand Forks.

References

395